Darcy Fehr is a Canadian actor.

Career 
Fehr's films include Desire (2000), The Saddest Music in the World (2003), There's Something Out There (2004) and The Law of Enclosures (2000). Fehr's most notable roles have been his portrayals of Canadian filmmaker Guy Maddin in Maddin's own Cowards Bend the Knee (2003) and My Winnipeg (2007).

Filmography

Film

Television

References

External links 

Living people
Canadian male film actors
Year of birth missing (living people)